St. Marena's Monastery is a monastery near Llëngë, Korçë County, Albania, dedicated to Marena the Monk and built in the 17th century. It is a Cultural Monument of Albania.

Description
The church is a small building around 12 meters long. The altar is divided from the central nave by a wooden carved iconostas. All the interiors are frescoed by 18th century paintings of Kostandin Shpataraku.

References

14th-century Eastern Orthodox church buildings
Cultural Monuments of Albania
Buildings and structures in Pogradec